In Norse mythology, Heimdall (from Old Norse Heimdallr) is a god. He is the son of Odin and nine mothers. Heimdall keeps watch for invaders and the onset of Ragnarök from his dwelling Himinbjörg, where the burning rainbow bridge Bifröst meets the sky. He is attested as possessing foreknowledge and keen senses, particularly eyesight and hearing. The god and his possessions are described in enigmatic manners. For example, Heimdall is emerald-toothed, "the head is called his sword," and he is "the whitest of the gods."

Heimdall possesses the resounding horn Gjallarhorn and the golden-maned horse Gulltoppr, along with a store of mead at his dwelling. He is the son of Nine Mothers, and he is said to be the originator of social classes among humanity. Other notable stories include the recovery of Freyja's treasured possession Brísingamen while doing battle in the shape of a seal with Loki. The antagonistic relationship between Heimdall and Loki is notable, as they are foretold to kill one another during the events of Ragnarök. Heimdallr is also known as Rig, Hallinskiði, Gullintanni, and Vindlér or Vindhlér.

Heimdall is attested in the Poetic Edda, compiled in the 13th century from earlier traditional material; in the Prose Edda and Heimskringla, both written in the 13th century; in the poetry of skalds; and on an Old Norse runic inscription found in England. Two lines of an otherwise lost poem about the god, Heimdalargaldr, survive. Due to the enigmatic nature of these attestations, scholars have produced various theories about the nature of the god, including his relation to sheep, borders, and waves.

Names and etymology
The etymology of the name is obscure, but 'the one who illuminates the world' has been proposed. Heimdallr may be connected to Mardöll, one of Freyja's names. Heimdallr and its variants are usually anglicized as Heimdall (with the nominative -r dropped).

Heimdall is attested as having three other names; Hallinskiði, Gullintanni, and Vindlér or Vindhlér. The name Hallinskiði is obscure, but has resulted in a series of attempts at deciphering it. Gullintanni literally means 'the one with the golden teeth'. Vindlér (or Vindhlér) translates as either 'the one protecting against the wind' or 'wind-sea'. All three have resulted in numerous theories about the god.

Attestations

Saltfleetby spindle whorl inscription
A lead spindle whorl bearing an Old Norse  Younger Futhark inscription that mentions Heimdall was discovered in Saltfleetby, England on September 1, 2010. The spindle whorl itself is dated from the year 1000 to 1100 AD. On the inscription, the god Heimdallr is mentioned alongside the god Odin and Þjálfi, a name of one of the god Thor's servants. Regarding the inscription reading, John Hines of Cardiff University comments that there is "quite an essay to be written over the uncertainties of translation and identification here; what are clear, and very important, are the names of two of the Norse gods on the side, Odin and Heimdallr, while Þjalfi (masculine, not the feminine in -a) is the recorded name of a servant of the god Thor."

Poetic Edda
In the Poetic Edda, Heimdall is attested in six poems; Völuspá, Grímnismál, Lokasenna, Þrymskviða, Rígsþula, and Hrafnagaldr Óðins.

Heimdall is mentioned three times in Völuspá. In the first stanza of the poem, the undead völva reciting the poem calls out for listeners to be silent and refers to the Norse god:

This stanza has led to various scholarly interpretations. The "holy races" have been considered variously as either humanity or the gods. The notion of humanity as "Heimdall's sons" is otherwise unattested and has also resulted in various interpretations. Some scholars have pointed to the prose introduction to the poem Rígsþula, where Heimdall is said to have once gone about people, slept between couples, and so doled out classes among them (see Rígsthula section below).

Later in Völuspá, the völva foresees the events of Ragnarök and the role in which Heimdall and Gjallarhorn will play at its onset; Heimdall will raise his horn and blow loudly. Due to manuscript differences, translations of the stanza vary:

Regarding this stanza, scholar Andy Orchard comments that the name Gjallarhorn may here mean "horn of the river Gjöll" as "Gjöll is the name of one of the rivers of the Underworld, whence much wisdom is held to derive", but notes that in the poem Grímnismál Heimdall is said to drink fine mead in his heavenly home Himinbjörg.

Earlier in the same poem, the völva mentions a scenario involving the hearing or horn (depending on translation of the Old Norse noun hljóð—translations bolded below for the purpose of illustration) of the god Heimdall:

Scholar Paul Schach comments that the stanzas in this section of  Völuspá are "all very mysterious and obscure, as it was perhaps meant to be". Schach details that "Heimdallar hljóð has aroused much speculation. Snorri [in the Prose Edda] seems to have confused this word with gjallarhorn, but there is otherwise no attestation of the use of hljóð in the sense of 'horn' in Icelandic. Various scholars have read this as "hearing" rather than "horn".

Scholar Carolyne Larrington comments that if "hearing" rather than "horn" is understood to appear in this stanza, the stanza indicates that Heimdall, like Odin, has left a body part in the well; his ear. Larrington says that "Odin exchanged one of his eyes for wisdom from Mimir, guardian of the well, while Heimdall seems to have forfeited his ear."

In the poem Grímnismál, Odin (disguised as Grímnir), tortured, starved and thirsty, tells the young Agnar of a number of mythological locations. The eighth location he mentions is Himinbjörg, where he says that Heimdall drinks fine mead:

Regarding the above stanza, Henry Adams Bellows comments that "in this stanza the two functions of Heimdall—as father of humanity [ . . . ] and as warder of the gods—seem both to be mentioned, but the second line in the manuscripts is apparently in bad shape, and in the editions it is more or less conjecture".

In the poem Lokasenna, Loki flyts with various gods who have met together to feast. At one point during the exchanges, the god Heimdall says that Loki is drunk and witless, and asks Loki why he won't stop speaking. Loki tells Heimdall to be silent, that he was fated a "hateful life", that Heimdall must always have a muddy back, and that he must serve as watchman of the gods. The goddess Skaði interjects and the flyting continues in turn.

The poem Þrymskviða tells of Thor's loss of his hammer, Mjöllnir, to the jötnar and quest to get it back. At one point in the tale, the gods gather at the thing and debate how to get Thor's hammer back from the jötnar, who demand the beautiful goddess Freyja in return for it. Heimdall advises that they simply dress Thor up as Freyja, during which he is described as hvítastr ása (translations of the phrase vary below) and is said to have foresight like the Vanir, a group of gods:

Regarding Heimdall's status as hvítastr ása (variously translated above as "brightest" (Thorpe), "whitest" (Bellows), and "most glittering" (Dodds)) and the comparison to the Vanir, scholar John Lindow comments that there are no other indications of Heimdall being considered among the Vanir (on Heimdall's status as "hvítastr ása ", see "scholarly reception" below).

The introductory prose to the poem Rígsþula says that "people say in the old stories" that Heimdall, described as a god among the Æsir, once fared on a journey. Heimdall wandered along a seashore, and referred to himself as Rígr. In the poem, Rígr, who is described as a wise and powerful god, walks in the middle of roads on his way to steads, where he meets a variety of couples and dines with them, giving them advice and spending three nights at a time between them in their bed. The wives of the couples become pregnant, and from them come the various classes of humanity.

Eventually a warrior home produces a promising boy, and as the boy grows older, Rígr comes out of a thicket, teaches the boy runes, gives him a name, and proclaims him to be his son. Rígr tells him to strike out and get land for himself. The boy does so, and so becomes a great war leader with many estates. He marries a beautiful woman and the two have many children and are happy. One of the children eventually becomes so skilled that he is able to share in runic knowledge with Heimdall, and so earns the title of Rígr himself. The poem breaks off without further mention of the god.

Prose Edda

In the Prose Edda, Heimdall is mentioned in the books Gylfaginning, Skáldskaparmál, and Háttatal. In Gylfaginning, the enthroned figure of High tells the disguised mythical king Gangleri of various gods, and, in chapter 25, mentions Heimdall. High says that Heimdall is known as "the white As", is "great and holy", and that nine maidens, all sisters, gave birth to him. Heimdall is called Hallinskiði and Gullintanni, and he has gold teeth. High continues that Heimdall lives in "a place" called Himinbjörg and that it is near Bifröst. Heimdall is the watchman of the gods, and he sits on the edge of heaven to guard the Bifröst bridge from the berg jötnar. Heimdall requires less sleep than a bird, can see at night just as well as if it were day, and for over a hundred leagues. Heimdall's hearing is also quite keen; he can hear grass as it grows on the earth, wool as it grows on sheep, and anything louder. Heimdall possesses a trumpet, Gjallarhorn, that, when blown, can be heard in all worlds, and "the head is referred to as Heimdall's sword". High then quotes the above-mentioned Grímnismál stanza about Himinbjörg and provides two lines from the otherwise lost poem about Heimdall, Heimdalargaldr, in which he proclaims himself to be the son of Nine Mothers.

In chapter 49, High tells of the god Baldr's funeral procession. Various deities are mentioned as having attended, including Heimdall, who there rode his horse Gulltopr.

In chapter 51, High foretells the events of Ragnarök. After the enemies of the gods will gather at the plain Vígríðr, Heimdall will stand and mightily blow into Gjallarhorn. The gods will awake and assemble together at the thing. At the end of the battle between various gods and their enemies, Heimdall will face Loki and they will kill one another. After, the world will be engulfed in flames. High then quotes the above-mentioned stanza regarding Heimdall raising his horn in Völuspá.

At the beginning of Skáldskaparmál, Heimdall is mentioned as having attended a banquet in Asgard with various other deities. Later in the book, Húsdrápa, a poem by 10th century skald Úlfr Uggason, is cited, during which Heimdall is described as having ridden to Baldr's funeral pyre.

In chapter 8, means of referring to Heimdall are provided; "son of nine mothers", "guardian of the gods", "the white As" (see Poetic Edda discussion regarding hvítastr ása above), "Loki's enemy", and "recoverer of Freyja's necklace". The section adds that the poem Heimdalargaldr is about him, and that, since the poem, "the head has been called Heimdall's doom: man's doom is an expression for sword". Hiemdallr is the owner of Gulltoppr, is also known as Vindhlér, and is a son of Odin. Heimdall visits Vágasker and Singasteinn and there vied with Loki for Brísingamen. According to the chapter, the skald Úlfr Uggason composed a large section of his Húsdrápa about these events and that Húsdrápa says that the two were in the shape of seals. A few chapters later, ways of referring to Loki are provided, including "wrangler with Heimdall and Skadi", and section of Úlfr Uggason's Húsdrápa is then provided in reference:

Renowned defender [Heimdall] of the powers' way [Bifrost], kind of counsel, competes with Farbauti's terribly sly son at Singastein. Son of eight mothers plus one, might of mood, is first to get hold of the beautiful sea-kidney [jewel, Brisingamen]. I announce it in strands of praise.

The chapter points out that in the above Húsdrápa section Heimdall is said to be the son of nine mothers.

Heimdall is mentioned once in Háttatal. There, in a composition by Snorri Sturluson, a sword is referred to as "Vindhlér's helmet-filler", meaning "Heimdall's head".

Heimskringla
In Ynglinga saga compiled in Heimskringla, Snorri presents a euhemerized origin of the Norse gods and rulers descending from them. In chapter 5, Snorri asserts that the Æsir settled in what is now Sweden and built various temples. Snorri writes that Odin settled in Lake Logrin "at a place which formerly was called Sigtúnir. There he erected a large temple and made sacrifices according to the custom of the Æsir. He took possession of the land as far as he had called it Sigtúnir. He gave dwelling places to the temple priests." Snorri adds that, after this, Njörðr dwelt in Nóatún, Freyr dwelt in Uppsala, Heimdall at Himinbjörg, Thor at Þrúðvangr, Baldr at Breiðablik and that to everyone Odin gave fine estates.

Visual depictions

A figure holding a large horn to his lips and clasping a sword on his hip appears on a stone cross from the Isle of Man. Some scholars have theorized that this figure is a depiction of Heimdall with Gjallarhorn.

A 9th or 10th century Gosforth Cross in Cumbria, England depicts a figure holding a horn and a sword standing defiantly before two open-mouthed beasts. This figure has been often theorized as depicting Heimdall with Gjallarhorn.

Scholarly reception
Heimdall's attestations have proven troublesome and enigmatic to interpret for scholars. A variety of sources describe the god as born from Nine Mothers, a puzzling description (for more in-depth discussion, see Nine Mothers of Heimdallr). Various scholars have interpreted this as a reference to the Nine Daughters of Ægir and Rán, personifications of waves. This would therefore mean Heimdall is born from the waves, an example of a deity born from the sea.

In the textual corpus, Heimdall is frequently described as maintaining a particular association with boundaries, borders, and liminal spaces, both spatial and temporal. For example, Gylfaginning describes the god as guarding the border of the land of the gods, Heimdall meets humankind at a coast, and, if accepted as describing Heimdall, Völuspá hin skamma describes him as born 'at the edge of the world' in 'days of yore' by the Nine Daughters of Ægir and Rán, and it is Heimdall's horn that signals the transition to the events of Ragnarök.

Additionally, Heimdall has a particular association with male sheep, rams. A form of the deity's name, Heimdali, occurs twice as a name for 'ram' in Skáldskaparmál, as does Heimdall's name Hallinskíði. Heimdall's unusual physical description has also been seen by various scholars as fitting this association: As mentioned above, Heimdall is described as gold-toothed (by way of his name Gullintanni), as having the ability to hear grass grow and the growth of wool on sheep, and as owning a sword called 'head' (rams have horns on their heads). This may mean that Heimdall was associated with the ram perhaps as a sacred and/or sacrificial animal or that the ancient Scandinavians may have conceived of him as having been a ram in appearance.

All of these topics—Heimdall's birth, his association with borders and boundaries, and his connection to sheep—have led to significant discussion among scholars. For example, influential philologist and folklorist Georges Dumézil, comparing motifs and clusters of motifs in western Europe, proposes the following explanation for Heimdall's birth and association with rams (italics are Dumézil's own):

In popular culture
As with many aspects of Norse mythology, Heimdall has appeared in many modern works. Heimdall appears as a character in Marvel Comics and is portrayed in the film versions by English actor Idris Elba.

Heimdall is the namesake of a crater on Callisto, a moon of Jupiter.

Heimdall is the protagonist of an eponymous video game released in 1991 and its 1994 sequel, Heimdall 2. In the 2002 Ensemble Studios game Age of Mythology, Heimdall is one of 12 gods the Norse can choose to worship. Heimdallr is one of the playable gods in the multiplayer online battle arena game Smite. Heimdall also appears as an antagonist in the 2022 action-adventure video game God of War Ragnarök and is played by the American actor Scott Porter.

See also
 Heimdall (comics)
 List of Germanic deities
 Germanic mythology

Notes

References

 
 Bellows, Henry Adams (1923). The Poetic Edda. American-Scandinavian Foundation.
 Cöllen, Sebastian (2015). Heimdallr – der rätselhafte Gott. Eine philologische und religionsgeschichtliche Untersuchung. Ergänzungsbände zum Reallexikon der Germanischen Altertumskunde 94. Berlin & Boston: Walter de Gruyter. 
 Daubney, A. (2010). LIN-D92A22: Early Medieval Spindle Whorl. Accessed: Jun 9, 2011 10:42:37 AM.
 Dodds, Jeramy. Trans. 2014. The Poetic Edda. Coach House Books. 
 Dumézil, Georges (1973). "Comparative Remarks on the Scandinavian God Heimdall". Trans. Francis Charat. In: Gods of the Ancient Northmen ed. Einar Haugen. University of California Press. 
 Faulkes, Anthony (Trans.) (1995). Edda. Everyman. 
 Hollander, Lee M. (Trans.) (2007). Heimskringla: History of the Kings of Norway. University of Texas Press. 
 Larrington, Carolyne (Trans.) (1999). The Poetic Edda. Oxford University Press. 
 Lindow, John (2002). Norse Mythology: A Guide to the Gods, Heroes, Rituals, and Beliefs. Oxford University Press. 
 Much, Rudolf 1930. "Der nordische Widdergott". Deutsche Islandforschung 1930, Vol. 1: Kultur, ed. Walther Heinrich Vogt, Veröffentlichungen der Schleswig- Holsteinischen Universitätsgesellschaft, 1928:1 (Breslau: F. Hirt, 1930), p. 63–67.
 Schach, Paul (1985). "Some Thoughts on Völuspá" as collected in Glendinning, R. J. Bessason, Heraldur (Editors). Edda: a Collection of Essays. University of Manitoba Press. 
 Simek, Rudolf (2007). Translated by Angela Hall. Dictionary of Northern Mythology. D.S. Brewer 
 Thorpe, Benjamin (Trans.) (1866) The Elder Edda of Saemund Sigfusson. Norrœna Society.

External links

 MyNDIR (My Norse Digital Image Repository) Illustrations of Heimdall from manuscripts and early print books. Clicking on the thumbnail will give you the full image and information concerning it.

Æsir
Killed deities
Norse gods
Sons of Odin

hu:Germán mitológia#Heimdall